Elmina M. Roys Gavitt (Roys; after marriage, Roys Gavitt or Roys-Gavitt; September 8, 1828 – August 25, 1898) was an American physician. She was also the founder and first editor of The Woman's Medical Journal, the first scientific monthly journal published to forward the interests exclusively of women physicians.

Gavitt was the first woman physician in Toledo, Ohio, arriving there to practice after graduation from medical school. She was characterized as having great vision and high ideals for women in medicine. It was because of the need for means of communication between the widely scattered women then practicing medicine that this publication, which was the first scientific monthly medical journal for medical women, was founded. Because of that need, Gavitt became its editor.

Early life and education
Elmina M. Roys was born in Fletcher, Vermont, September 8, 1828. She was the second of eight children. She came of Puritan, New England ancestry. Her parents were to a great extent the instructors of their family, both in religious and secular matters, for there were public schools but half of the year, and church privileges were few and far between. 

When Gavitt was fourteen years old, business interests caused a removal of the family to Woonsocket, Rhode Island. For the next twelve years, Gavitt dealt with ill-health.

Hoping to benefit herself by striving for what seemed then almost unattainable, and seeing no opportunities available to American women which promised more usefulness than the profession of medicine, she entered the Woman's Medical College of Philadelphia, in 1862.

Career
In 1865, she was called to Clifton Springs, New York, as house physician in an institution there. Two years later, she went to Rochester, Minnesota, and commenced a general practice, which was a success. In 1869, she removed to Toledo, Ohio. During that year, she showed one of her most marked characteristics, self-sacrifice, by adopting a blind sister's six children, the youngest but two days old and the oldest but twelve years old.

On September 9, 1876, she married Rev. Elnathan Corrington Gavitt (1808-1896), an elder of the Methodist Episcopal Church.

Even after marriage, she continued with her profession, in which she was among the first in the State of Ohio. In January 1893, at Toledo, she founded The Woman's Medical Journal and served as its first editor-in-chief. It was devoted to the interests and advancement of woman physicians of the United States. After the 1915 establishment of the American Medical Women's Association and during its first seven years, the journal served as the association's official organ. It was distributed to women physicians as a means of communication and to further their professional progress. Other women physicians became physician writers, but little did Gavitt realize that in so doing, she was establishing the only historical record of its day that documented the activities of medical women.

Personal life
Rev. Gavitt died in Toledo, Ohio, March 15, 1896. Dr. Gavitt spent the winter of 1897 in Southern California. She died August 25, 1898.

Notes

References

Attribution

Bibliography

External links
 

1828 births
1898 deaths
19th-century American physicians
19th-century American women physicians
19th-century American non-fiction writers
19th-century American women writers
19th-century American businesspeople
Woman's Medical College of Pennsylvania alumni
People from Franklin County, Vermont
Medical journal editors
American magazine founders
Physicians from Vermont
Writers from Vermont
American medical writers
American women non-fiction writers
People from Toledo, Ohio
Wikipedia articles incorporating text from A Woman of the Century